Irina Shtork (born 7 April 1993) is an Estonian former ice dancer. With partner Taavi Rand, she is the 2013 International Cup of Nice bronze medalist, the 2013 Ukrainian Open silver medalist, and a four-time Estonian national champion.

Career 
Early in her career, Shtork skated with Alexei Trokhlev and Roman Zakharov.

She began competing with Taavi Rand in the 2004–05 season. They debuted on the ISU Junior Grand Prix circuit in 2006 and placed 22nd in their first appearance at Junior Worlds in 2007. The following season, the duo again finished 22nd at Junior Worlds. They parted ways at the end of the season.

Prior to the 2009–10 season, Shork and Rand decided to re-form their partnership. They competed on the junior level in the first half of the season. At the 2009 Nebelhorn Trophy, Rand's brother Kristjan Rand and his American partner Caitlin Mallory earned a spot for Estonia in the Olympic ice dancing event. Mallory/Rand ultimately decided not to use it because she would have to renounce her U.S. citizenship in order to receive Estonian citizenship (required only at the Olympics). Estonia gave the spot to its second ice dance team, Shtork/Rand. Making their senior international debut, they placed 23rd at the 2010 Winter Olympics in Vancouver.

Shtork/Rand returned to the junior level for the first half of the 2010–11 season, placing 6th and 8th at their two JGP events. They also appeared at one senior event, the 2011 European Championships, finishing 21st. They ended their season at the 2011 World Junior Championships where they placed 10th.

In the 2011–12 season, Shtork/Rand continued to move between the junior and senior levels. They won the silver medal at a JGP event in Estonia. They then placed 14th at the 2012 European Championships, 11th at the 2012 World Junior Championships, and 22nd at the 2012 World Championships.

In 2012–13, Shtork/Rand won their first senior international medals—bronze at the 2013 Cup of Nice and silver at the Volvo Open Cup. They placed a career-best 11th at the 2013 European Championships before finishing 25th at the 2013 World Championships.

In 2015, Shtork announced her competitive retirement.

Programs 
(with Rand)

Competitive highlights 
(with Rand)

References

External links 

 

1993 births
Living people
Figure skaters from Tallinn
Estonian female ice dancers
Figure skaters at the 2010 Winter Olympics
Olympic figure skaters of Estonia